José Eustaquio Alves Lemos Filho (born 30 July 1993 in Minas Gerais, Brazil), known as Júnior Lemos, is a Brazilian professional footballer who plays for Central

External links
 

Living people
1993 births
Brazilian footballers
Association football midfielders
América Futebol Clube (MG) players
Nacional Esporte Clube (MG) players
Tupi Football Club players
Clube Atlético Tricordiano players
Coras de Nayarit F.C. footballers
Central Sport Club players
Clube Náutico Capibaribe players
Luverdense Esporte Clube players
União Recreativa dos Trabalhadores players
Campeonato Brasileiro Série B players
Campeonato Brasileiro Série C players
Campeonato Brasileiro Série D players
Campeonato Pernambucano players
Ascenso MX players
Brazilian expatriate footballers
Expatriate footballers in Mexico
Brazilian expatriate sportspeople in Mexico
Footballers from Belo Horizonte